Paul Lindholdt is an American author, ecocritic, editor, historian, journalist, poet, and professor. Originally from Seattle, he teaches at Eastern Washington University. He has won a Washington State Book Award for his ecological memoir In Earshot of Water and recognition from both the Society of Professional Journalists and the Academy of American Poets.

Professorship 
Lindholdt began his career as a lecturer at Idaho State University from 1984–87 then continued at Western Washington University from 1987–90. In 1990 he visited at the University of Idaho as assistant professor until migrating back to his home state of Washington in 1994 at Eastern Washington University. He was promoted to Assistant Professor (1997–2003),  Associate Professor (2003–07), and Professor of English from 2007–present. Students rank him among the ten most effective teachers at his university.

Lindholdt earned his PhD in early American literature, emphasizing environmental humanities vis-a-vis the sciences in early America. His teaching ranges from freshman honors to graduate research seminars. He has spoken at three symposia in France and dozens of stateside conferences.

Recognition
 Michael Chappell River Hero Award, Spokane Riverkeeper, 2018.
 Washington State Book Award for Biography / Memoir, 2012, In Earshot of Water: Notes from the Columbia Plateau (University of Iowa Press, 2011).
 First Place and Second Place, Society of Professional Journalists, Region 10, Energy and Environmental Reporting, 2000.
 Leonard Steinberg Memorial Prize, Academy of American Poets, Penn State University, 1984.

Books 
 Interrogating Travel: Guidance from a Reluctant Tourist. Louisiana State University Press, forthcoming June 2023.
 Making Landfall: Poems, Farmington, Maine: Encircle Publications, 2018.
 The Spokane River, edited, cowritten, and introduced. Seattle: University of Washington Press, 2018.
 Explorations in Ecocriticism: Advocacy, Bioregionalism, and Visual Design, Lanham, Maryland: Lexington Books, 2015.
 In Earshot of Water: Notes from the Columbia Plateau, Iowa City: University of Iowa Press, 2011.
 The Canoe and the Saddle: A Critical Edition. [1862.] Lincoln: University of Nebraska Press, 2006.
 Holding Common Ground: The Individual and Public Lands in the American West. Introduction and edited with Derrick Knowles. Spokane: Eastern Washington University Press, 2005.
 History and Folklore of the Cowichan Indians. [1901.] Phoenix: Marquette Books, 2004. Edited and introduction.
 Cascadia Wild: Protecting an International Ecosystem. Edited with Mitch Friedman. Bellingham, Washington: Greater Ecosystem Alliance, 1993.
 John Josselyn, Colonial Traveler: A Critical Edition of 'Two Voyages to New-England'. Hanover, New Hampshire: University Press of New England, 1988.

Ecocriticism & Historiography 
Since 2012, Lindholdt is a contributing historian for HistoryLink, the open-source Seattle-based encyclopedia of Washington State history, and a narrative editor for Trumpeter Journal of Ecosophy founded in Canada in 1983 as the leading periodical on Deep Ecology.
 "A Warrior's Portrait." Spokesman-Review Dec. 1, 2013.
 "Lokout (1834-1913)." HistoryLink Oct. 13, 2013
 "Antidotes to Humanism." The Trumpeter Journal of Ecosophy 28.1 (2012).
 "From Sublimity to Ecopornography: Assessing the Bureau of Reclamation Art Collection." Journal of Ecocriticism 1.1 (January 2009): 1-25.
 "The Fine Art of Bureaucracy." High Country News Jan. 19, 2009.
 "Theodore Winthrop in the Washington Territory." Columbia Spring 2007.
 "An Iconography of American Sabotage." Nature et Progrès: Interactions, Exclusions et Mutations. Ed. Pierre Lagayette. Paris: Presses de l'université, Paris Sorbonne, 2006. 151-68.

Personal life 
Lindholdt married Karen Palrang at High Rock Lookout on Mt. Rainier in August 1994. A law student at the University of Idaho, Karen signed on to an environmental campaign Lindholdt was organizing. They have two grown sons and divide time between Spokane, Washington, and Sandpoint, Idaho.

Educated at Penn State (PhD 1985) and Western Washington University (MA 1980, BA 1978), Lindholdt studied creative writing with Annie Dillard and is working on a biography of her.

References

External links 
 
 Paul Lindholdt - Eastern Washington University website
 Rate My Professors website

Year of birth missing (living people)
Living people
American literary critics
Eastern Washington University faculty
Idaho State University faculty
Western Washington University faculty
University of Idaho faculty
Writers from Seattle